Lilac-throated roller may refer to:

 Lilac-breasted roller, a species of bird found in sub-Saharan Africa and the southern Arabian Peninsula
 a subspecies of the purple roller, a bird found in sub-Saharan Africa

Birds by common name